Minnie 'n Me was a 1990s merchandise branding program from The Walt Disney Company featuring the cartoon character (and Disney mascot) Minnie Mouse in her childhood days. It is the same continuity of the Topolino series, Paperino Paperotto. Her youthful companions include Daisy Duck, Clarabelle Cow, Penelope "Penny" Pooch, Patti Pony, T.J. Turtle, Heather Hippo, Lilly Lamb, Minnie's dog Fifi the Peke and Daisy's kitten Trixie. Later on, Disney added Figaro, Mickey Mouse, and Donald Duck to the mix. On the whole, this line of merchandise was mainly targeted towards preteen girls. Around 1991 Disney made 24 books call the best friend collection around 1991 to 1992.

On September 18, 1990, the CD, "Minnie n Me: Songs Just for Girls" was released featuring child vocalist Christa Larson.

Disney merchandise